Enrique Guittens (born 4 December 1931) is a Venezuelan weightlifter. He competed in the men's light heavyweight event at the 1960 Summer Olympics.

References

1931 births
Living people
Venezuelan male weightlifters
Olympic weightlifters of Venezuela
Weightlifters at the 1960 Summer Olympics
Sportspeople from Port of Spain
Pan American Games medalists in weightlifting
Pan American Games silver medalists for Venezuela
Weightlifters at the 1959 Pan American Games
20th-century Venezuelan people